The 2023 OFC Champions League will be the 22nd edition of the Oceanian Club Championship, Oceania's premier club football tournament organized by the Oceania Football Confederation (OFC), and the 17th season under the current OFC Champions League name. The winner of the final will earn the right to play in the 2023 FIFA Club World Cup in Saudi Arabia.

Auckland City FC are the defending champions.

Teams
A total of 18 teams from all 11 OFC member associations may enter the competition.
The seven developed associations (Fiji, New Caledonia, New Zealand, Papua New Guinea, Solomon Islands, Tahiti, Vanuatu) are awarded a berth each in the groups stage, after playing a national playoff between the top 2 clubs in the league.
The four developing associations (American Samoa, Cook Islands, Samoa, Tonga) are awarded one berth each in the qualifying stage, with the winners advancing to the group stage.

Qualifying stage

Preliminary group

National play-offs

Group stage

The four teams in each group will play each other on a round-robin basis at a centralised venue in Vanuatu. The winners and runners-up of each group will advance to the semi-finals of the knockout stage.

All of the qualified teams for the group stage are as follows:

 Auckland City
 Suva
 Tiga Sport
 Pirae
 Ifira Black Bird
 Lupe ole Soaga
 Solomon Warriors
 Hekari United

Top goalscorers

References

External links

2023
1
Scheduled association football competitions